Chinese Cultural Centre may refer to:

Places

 Chinese Cultural Centre, Calgary
 Chinese Cultural Centre, Vancouver
 Chinese Cultural Center, Phoenix